Compton House may refer to:

In England 
 Compton House, a mansion in Over Compton, Dorset
 Compton Beauchamp House, a mansion in Oxfordshire
 Compton House, in Wentworth, Virginia Water, Surrey - where Prajadhipok, King of Siam lived, and died in 1941
 Compton Wynyates, a Tudor country house in Warwickshire
 Compton Verney House, a mansion in Warwickshire
 Compton Park House, Compton Chamberlayne or Compton House, a country house in Wiltshire
 Compton House, Liverpool, a department store built in 1867

In the United States 
 The Arthur H. Compton House, Chicago, Illinois
 The David Compton House, Mauricetown, New Jersey
 The Captain Edward Compton House, Mauricetown, New Jersey
 The Compton-Wood House, Little Rock, Arkansas